Jack Vaughn Jr. (born January 27, 1974) is an American multi-Grammy winning record and television producer and label head. He created and ran Comedy Central Records, Slimstyle Records, and Third World Underground, currently runs Comedy Dynamics and produces television specials for the label.

See also
 Comedy Central Records
 New Wave Dynamics
 Jack Vaughn

References

External links

1974 births
Living people
American stand-up comedians
Record producers from New York (state)
Television producers from New York City
Comedians from New York City
21st-century American comedians